Lorraine of the Timberlands is a 1921 American silent short Western melodrama film produced by Cyrus J. Williams and distributed by Pathé Exchange. It was directed by Robert North Bradbury and stars Tom Santschi and Ruth Stonehouse.

This short film was part of the "Santschi Series", which included the other short films The Honor of Rameriz, The Spirit of the Lake, The Heart of Doreon, and Mother o' Dreams, all of which starred Santschi.

Plot 
A man (Santschi) has lost his faith in God and seeks revenge for the loss of his wife and child. At one point, the villain has him jailed, but he escapes when a bolt of lightning strikes the jail. He is reunited with his daughter, who has since grown up.

Cast 
 Tom Santschi
 Ruth Stonehouse
 Andrew Waldron
 Clark Comstock
 Earl Hughes

Reception 
Santschi's performance received positive reviews, but the plot was deemed melodramatic.

References

External links 
 
 Lobby card

1921 films
American black-and-white films